Antoine Krilone Kombouaré (born 16 November 1963) is a French professional football manager and former player who is the head coach of Ligue 1 club Nantes.

Playing career
Born in the French overseas territory of New Caledonia, Kombouaré began his career at local club WS Plum Nouméa in Nouméa in 1975, before moving to mainland France with Nantes in 1983. He later joined Paris Saint-Germain in 1990. At the Parisian club, he became famous for a winning header he scored in the dying seconds of a UEFA Cup quarter-final match against Real Madrid during the 1992–93 season. The header qualified PSG for the next round with a 4–1 scoreline. Kombouaré had already scored a decisive goal in similar circumstances against Anderlecht in the previous round. His habit of netting tie-deciding headers earned him the name of "Casque d'Or", which means "Golden Helmet" in French. In 1994–95, during a UEFA Champions League quarter-final against Johan Cruyff's Barcelona "dream team", Kombouaré captained PSG to a resounding and unexpected 2–1 win which qualified the French side for the semi-final, which they lost to AC Milan.

In all, Kombouaré spent five seasons in Paris, winning the Coupe de France in 1993 and 1995 and the Coupe de la Ligue in 1995. Kombouaré scored a penalty in the 1993 Coupe de France Final. He also played nine games in the title-winning side of 1993–94 under Artur Jorge. From 1992–93, he found his first-team appearances restricted by the presence of fellow defenders Alain Roche, Paul Le Guen and Ricardo. Kombouaré became a cult hero among PSG fans for his habit of scoring last-minute winning goals and his presence and composure in big games.

Kombouaré signed for Swiss side Sion in 1995 for an undisclosed fee, then joined Aberdeen a year later for £300,000; he was signed by manager Roy Aitken to add experience to the shaky Aberdeen defence. He made 50 appearances for Aberdeen and scored three goals. He left Aberdeen in May 1998.

Managerial career

Strasbourg
In 2003, Kombouaré was already being tipped to coach PSG, the club where he made his name as a player, and had spent four years coaching the reserves team with positive results. However, the arrival of Vahid Halilhodžić at the helm forced him to change his plans. He therefore joined Strasbourg where he achieved an impressive 13th spot in the league, playing some good football along the way. However, a poor start to the 2004–05 season prompted him to leave the Alsace-based club.

Valenciennes
In July 2005, Kombouaré was appointed at Valenciennes, then playing in the second tier of French football. In his first season, he led them to promotion to the top flight, a level from which the club had been relegated in 1993. In the three seasons that followed, Kombouaré helped the club to stabilize itself at the top level of French football. He improved the club's position in every season: 14th in 2006–07, 13th in 2007–08 and 12th in 2008–09, establishing his credentials as a coach who could achieve impressive results on a tight budget.

Paris Saint-Germain
In May 2009, Kombouaré's former club PSG came calling back to him, offering him the position of manager. He accepted and signed a three-year contract, replacing Paul Le Guen, with whom he had played at Nantes and PSG. In 2009–10, the Parisian club, in spite of its new signings such as Mevlüt Erdinç and Grégory Coupet, performed poorly in the league and finished in mid-table. Kombouaré made up for this by leading the club to success in the Coupe de France, where they beat Monaco in the final.

In 2010–11, he again led the club to the Coupe de France Final, which they lost to French champions Lille. In the Coupe de la Ligue, PSG looked set for a final showdown with fierce rivals Marseille, but were stunned by Montpellier in the semi-final. The side performed much better in the league, finishing fourth in spite of a limited playing squad. The Parisians almost achieved qualification to the Champions League, but were let down by tiredness and an inability to perform when it mattered most. However, the attacking brand of football played under Kombouaré's guidance brought acclaim from both fans and writers for the capital club, with many people agreeing that PSG were playing their best football since Luis Fernández's first spell as coach between 1994 and 1996.

During the 2011–12 season, PSG crashed out of the Coupe de la Ligue and the Europa League during the first half of the season, and on 29 December 2011 – with his club top of the table – Kombouaré was sacked by PSG sporting director Leonardo and replaced by Carlo Ancelotti, putting an end to much speculation about his position at the club. Despite holding top spot in Ligue 1 when he was sacked, the club ultimately finished as runners-up to champions Montpellier.

Al-Hilal
On 27 June 2012, it was confirmed that Kombouaré was appointed head coach of Saudi Arabian side Al-Hilal on a one-year deal with an option for a second, but he was sacked on 31 January 2013.

Lens
On 18 June 2013, Kombouaré became manager of Lens, earning his team a promotion in his first season at the club after it finished in second place in Ligue 2.

Guingamp
On 30 May 2016, Kombouaré became manager of Ligue 1 side Guingamp. They finished the season in mid-table. On 6 November 2018, he was sacked due to poor results.

Dijon
On 10 January 2019, Kombouaré became manager of Dijon, replacing Olivier Dall'Oglio. After winning the relegation play-off to keep Dijon in Ligue 1, he parted ways with the club on 9 June 2019, with Stéphane Jobard taking over as manager on 20 June.

Toulouse
On 14 October 2019, Kombouaré was appointed as manager of Toulouse.
On 6 January 2020, Toulouse terminated Kombouaré as manager following the club's humiliating 1–0 loss to Championnat National 2 side Saint-Pryvé Saint-Hilaire in the Coupe de France. Under Kombouaré, the club had lost ten matches in a row, leading him to be dismissed and replaced by Denis Zanko.

Nantes
On 11 February 2021, Kombouaré signed with Ligue 1 side Nantes. He joined the club during the second half of the season, helping Les Canaris stay in Ligue 1. Nantes finished 18th in the league, and won the play-offs against Kombouaré's former side Toulouse.

In the 2021–22 season, Kombouaré led Nantes to a Coupe de France victory. They defeated Nice 1–0 in the final.

Managerial statistics

Honours

Player
Paris Saint-Germain
Division 1: 1993–94, runner-up: 1992–93
Coupe de France: 1992–93, 1994–95
Coupe de la Ligue: 1994–95

Sion
Swiss Cup: 1995–96

Manager
Valenciennes
Ligue 2: 2005–06

Paris Saint-Germain
Coupe de France: 2009–10, runner-up: 2010–11

Lens
Ligue 2 runner-up: 2013–14
Nantes

 Coupe de France: 2021–22

Individual
Ligue 2 Manager of the Year: 2005–06

Orders
Chevalier of the Légion d'honneur: 2015

References

External links

Antoine Kombouaré profile at Paris Saint-Germain official website

1963 births
Living people
French people of New Caledonian descent
Black French sportspeople
Kanak people
People from Nouméa
New Caledonian footballers
French footballers
Association football defenders
FC Nantes players
Paris Saint-Germain F.C. players
FC Sion players
Aberdeen F.C. players
Racing Club de France Football players
Ligue 1 players
Swiss Super League players
Scottish Football League players
Championnat National players
French expatriate footballers
French expatriate sportspeople in Switzerland
French expatriate sportspeople in Scotland
Expatriate footballers in Switzerland
Expatriate footballers in Scotland
French football managers
Paris Saint-Germain F.C. non-playing staff
RC Strasbourg Alsace managers
Valenciennes FC managers
Paris Saint-Germain F.C. managers
Al Hilal SFC managers
RC Lens managers
En Avant Guingamp managers
Dijon FCO managers
Toulouse FC managers
FC Nantes managers
Ligue 1 managers
Ligue 2 managers
Saudi Professional League managers
French expatriate football managers
French expatriate sportspeople in Saudi Arabia
Expatriate football managers in Saudi Arabia
Chevaliers of the Légion d'honneur